Puck App is a mobile application that allows hockey players to quickly find and rent a hockey goalie. It was founded in 2015 in Toronto, they operates in Canada.

History

Puck App was founded in 2016 by Niki Sawni. Users can rate the goalies, message with available goalies, and coordinate skill levels. In 2017, Puck App expanded to Western Canada and has over 1,000 goalies registered.

References

Mobile applications